Compsolechia scitella is a moth of the family Gelechiidae. It was described by Francis Walker in 1864. It is found in Amazonas in  Brazil and in Peru.

Adults are dark cupreous, the forewings with a broad exterior ochraceous band, which is much rounded on its outer side and contains an acutely angular black streak. A whitish transverse slightly denticulated line is found near the outer side of the band and there are a few black and white longitudinal streaks between the line and the exterior border, which is very oblique. The hindwings have a white costa along half the length from the base.

References

Moths described in 1864
Compsolechia